The Moore House is a historic house at 405 Center Street in Searcy, Arkansas.  It is a -story stuccoed wood-frame structure, with a picturesque combination of Folk Victorian and Craftsman stylistic elements.  It has a hipped roof topped by a flat deck, with several projecting gables, and stuccoed chimneys.  A porch extends across part of the front and side, supported by brick posts.  It was built about 1925, and represents an unusual late instance of the Folk Victorian style.

The house was listed on the National Register of Historic Places in 1991, and was delisted in 2022.

See also
National Register of Historic Places listings in White County, Arkansas

References

Houses on the National Register of Historic Places in Arkansas
Victorian architecture in Arkansas
Houses completed in 1925
Houses in Searcy, Arkansas
National Register of Historic Places in Searcy, Arkansas
Former National Register of Historic Places in Arkansas
American Craftsman architecture in Arkansas
Bungalow architecture in Arkansas
1925 establishments in Arkansas